Île Saint-Christophe is a small island adjacent to Saint-Quentin Island in the Saint-Maurice River at its confluence with the Saint Lawrence River in the city of Trois-Rivières, Quebec, Canada.

The island is home to HMCS Radisson, a Canadian Forces Naval Reserve Division.

River islands of Quebec
Islands of the Saint Lawrence River
Trois-Rivières
Landforms of Mauricie